Waseelah Fadhl Saad (born November 25, 1989 in Aden) is a track and field sprint athlete who competes internationally for Yemen.

Saad represented Yemen at the 2008 Summer Olympics in Beijing. She competed at the 100 metres sprint on August 16, 2008 and placed seventh in her heat without advancing to the second round. She ran the distance in a time of 13.60 seconds.

References

External links
 

1989 births
Living people
Yemeni female sprinters
Olympic athletes of Yemen
Athletes (track and field) at the 2008 Summer Olympics
People from Aden
Olympic female sprinters